Interfaith Youth Core (IFYC) is a Chicago-based non-profit founded in 2002 by Eboo Patel. In May 2022 it changed its name to Interfaith America. The organization’s stated mission is to make interfaith cooperation a social norm. Today it operates with approximately 30 full-time staff and a $4-million budget. It has worked on five continents and with over 200 college campuses domestically.

History
IFYC officially launched its operations at the 1999 Parliament of the World’s Religions in Cape Town, South Africa, under the direction of Patel and organizers Anastasia White and Jeff Pinzino. At the time, Patel was finishing up his doctorate in the sociology of religion at Oxford University, so Pinzino spearheaded much of IFYC’s early organizational growth. Upon completing his doctorate in 2002, Patel took over as executive director. A $35,000 grant from the Ford Foundation enabled IFYC to run its first conference of interfaith leaders and teach a graduate-level course on the methodology of interfaith work. Since then, the organization has coordinated the Chicago Youth Council, a group of eight student interfaith leaders, Days of Interfaith Youth Service, and the Fellows Alliance, a year-long fellowship that trained student interfaith leaders on individual campuses. Patel discuses the genesis of IFYC in-depth in his memoir, Acts of Faith Today the organization reaches college students through its Interfaith Leadership Institutes (ILIs) and the Better Together Campaign.

Mission and Methodology
IFYC identifies a divisive public conversation about religion as a major problem facing America today. The organization seeks to promote a different narrative that instead emphasizes cooperation among different religious and secular communities. IFYC works to foster what it calls a "critical mass" of interfaith leaders on college campuses that will later craft and drive this dialogue of interfaith cooperation.
 
Based on the work of Diana Eck’s Pluralism Project, IFYC identifies three core components of interfaith cooperation: respect for religious identity, mutually inspiring relationships, and common action for the common good. In the first component, individuals create a space where each feels comfortable sharing his or her faith identity, and engaging with others’ religious perspectives. Such a space enables individuals to identify values shared by many religious and secular traditions, such as justice, mercy and compassion. By establishing appreciative relationships, IFYC’s methodology encourages individuals to collaborate across faith traditions on service projects that speak to these commonly held values.

Programs
Better Together and Interfaith Leadership Institutes (ILIs)

The Better Together Campaign is IFYC’s model for an interfaith action campaign on college campuses nationally. The campaign is designed to function in a variety of campus environments while allowing students to adapt it to their own community. Under the current campaign model, students begin by deciding upon an important social issue in their community (hunger, poverty, public health, etc.) around which to focus interfaith service work. The model then offers students several events they may choose to run on campus:
 Talk Better Together, in which participants have short, rapid-fire conversations about personal beliefs;
 Watch Better Together, which utilizes film to spark discussion about a social issue;
 Play Better Together, which gathers students together around a game;
 Fast Better Together, in which students fast alongside each other; and
 Do Better Together, which puts students to work on a service project that relates to a social issue.
While any group of students may run the campaign, IFYC staff communicate the campaign’s ideas and methods at four day-long ILIs. IFYC partnered with the White House to hold its first ILIs at Georgetown University in October 2010. The organization put on additional ILIs at Dominican University in River Forest, Illinois, in June 2011 and at Georgetown in July 2011.  
In the 2010-2011 Better Together Campaign, IFYC staff reached students on 97 different campuses. Each of these students engaged, on average, 100 additional students; thus the campaign reached approximately 100,000 people in its first year.
   
President Obama’s Interfaith Campus and Community Service Challenge
In April 2011, President Obama invited the presidents of 2,000 colleges to participate in the President’s interfaith Campus and Community Service Challenge by committing to a year of interfaith service. Each participating campus submitted to the White House a proposal for a year of interfaith service and dialogue activities focused around one particular social issue in the local community. The Challenge kicked off in early August with a White House-hosted convening which brought together student and staff leaders from colleges and universities participating in the Challenge. So far, over 200 campuses have signed up for the Challenge. IFYC staff worked intensively with the White House to coordinate the launch of the program and to provide support throughout the 2011-2012 school year.

Campus Partnerships
IFYC’s Campus Partnerships department works directly with college faculty and staff to productively engage religious diversity on individual campuses. The organization offers three kinds of engagements: outreach engagements, deep engagements, and model campus engagements. Outreach engagements, which typically last one or two days, introduce campus staff to IFYC’s programs and methodology. With six-month to year-long deep engagements, IFYC staff work with campus staff to build a community "ecology" that supports interfaith cooperation by targeting one sector of campus life (e.g., the freshman class, the interfaith center, etc.). Through model campus engagements, schools work with IFYC for six months to a year to make their campus a model of interfaith cooperation.

Interfaith Leaders for Social Action
In September 2011, IFYC launched recruitment for its Interfaith Leaders for Social Action (ILSA) program. Through partnerships with NGOs in four different cities in India, ILSA will train 50 interfaith leaders, whose work will address social issues like child labor and domestic violence. The program receives support from the United States Department of State’s Bureau of Democracy, Human Rights & Labor—Office of International Religious Freedom.

References

Bibliography

Interfaith organizations
Non-profit organizations based in Chicago